Cadmus is a genus of leaf beetles which are commonly called case bearing leaf beetles in the subfamily Chrysomelinae.
They are widespread throughout Australia and include  5 subgenera and 68 species.

Case bearing leaf beetles produce eggs encased in faecal material and larvae when hatched feed on leaf litter while housed in this protective home.  The adults feed on Eucalyptus including Eucalyptus globulus but rarely become a major problem for forestry.

Species
 Cadmus (Brachycaulus) colossus
 Cadmus (Cadmus) alternans
 Cadmus (Cadmus) apicalis
 Cadmus (Cadmus) crucicollis
 Cadmus (Cyphodera) chlamydiformis
 Cadmus (Lachnabothra) bicornutus
 Cadmus (Prionopleura) bifasciata

References

Chrysomelidae genera
Taxa named by Wilhelm Ferdinand Erichson
Cryptocephalinae